GTel Zimbabwe is a Zimbabwean owned company that develops and manufactures ICT products and services. It is the first locally owned mobile phone manufacturer in Zimbabwe. In 2014, GTel launched the SL 5.5 which became the 2nd slimmest mobile phone handset in the world behind the Asian Oppo that year.

History
GTel Zimbabwe was founded in October 2009 as a franchise of G-Tide Mobile International. It re-branded to GTel in July 2011. GTel Zimbabwe was founded by Chamunorwa Shumba and Cheryl Shumba. GTel is headquartered in Harare and Shumba is the founding Chief Executive Officer. 

As of 2015, GTel had one million mobile phone users in Zimbabwe. In 2015, the company expanded its operations to Kenya. The company released three new phone models in 2018, including the X7 that has wireless charging.

References

External links

Telecommunications companies of Zimbabwe
Mobile phone manufacturers